Manoba jinghongensis is a moth in the family Nolidae. It was described by Tian-Yu Shao, Cheng-De Li and Hui-Lin Han in 2009. It is found in Yunnan, China.

References

Moths described in 2009
Nolinae